The Unseeable (literally "Committing Adultery with Ghost") is a 2006 Thai horror film directed by Wisit Sasanatieng. This is the first film of another writer's screenplay by the director. The writer is Kongkiat Khomsiri, one of the "Ronin Team" credited with directing the 2005 Thai horror film Art of the Devil 2.

Plot

Set in 1934 Siam, the story involves a young pregnant woman named Nualjan who's searching for her missing husband. She comes to stay in the spooky rural mansion of a widow, Runjuan. The overgrown property is managed by the stern caretaker Somchit and inhabited by a number of other people, including another young woman, Choy, who becomes Nualjin's friend, as well as an old woman, a little girl and a man who is seen at the back of the property, digging a hole.

Cast
 Supornthip Choungrangsee as Runjuan
 Siraphun Wattanajinda as Nualjan
 Tassawan Seneewongse as Somchit
 Wisa Kongka as Choy

Origins
The Unseeable marks a change for Wisit Sasanatieng, who made his mark with the colourful western, Tears of the Black Tiger and the romantic-comedy, Citizen Dog. With his third film, Wisit was restrained by budgetary concerns from the stylizations of his first two films, but in doing so he was able to make it an homage to films of the 1930s and the stars of that era, including Bette Davis and Joan Crawford. Thai pop culture influences come from illustrator Hem Vejakorn, who wrote a series of 10-satang graphic novel ghost stories in the 1930s and '40s. The reference was so striking that the Barom Khru Foundation, which claims to supervise Hem's works, issued a statement warning Five Star Production to not violate the copyright of Hem's work. However, Wisit said the film was not an adaptation of any of Hem's works but was generally inspired by Hem's style.

Reception

Festivals and awards
 2007 Brussels International Festival of Fantasy Film
 2007 Bangkok International Film Festival (ASEAN competition)
 2007 Cinemanila International Film Festival
 2007 Taipei Golden Horse Film Festival – NETPAC Award

References
 Thai Cinema News, May 20, 2006. Cannes 2006 report, ThaiCinema.org.

Notes

External links
 Official Thai site
 Official English-language site
 
 Trailer at American Film Market

2006 films
Five Star Production films
Thai ghost films
Thai-language films
Thai horror films
Films directed by Wisit Sasanatieng
Films set in 1934
Thai supernatural horror films